Boodog is a Mongolian cuisine dish of barbecued goat or Tarbagan marmot cooked with heated stones inserted into the carcass. It is prepared on special occasions. The meat, often accompanied by vegetables, is cooked with heated stones in a sealed milk can (khorkhog) or the de-boned body of the animals. Marmot hunting usually takes place in the fall when the animals are larger and have been preparing for hibernation.

The dish features in Matthew Salleh's documentary film Barbecue.

See also
Regional variations of barbecue

References

Mongolian cuisine
Barbecue